Áttila de Carvalho (born 16 December 1910, date of death unknown), known as just Áttila, was a Brazilian football player. He has played for Brazil national team.

References

1910 births
Year of death missing
Footballers from Rio de Janeiro (city)
Brazilian footballers
Brazil international footballers
1934 FIFA World Cup players
America Football Club (RJ) players
Botafogo de Futebol e Regatas players
Association football forwards